Adnan al-Malki (‎) (1918 – 22 April 1955) was a Syrian Army officer and political figure in the mid-20th century. He served as the deputy-chief of staff of the army and was one of the most powerful figures in the army and in national politics until his assassination, which was blamed on a Syrian Social Nationalist Party (SSNP) militant in 1955. At the time of his assassination he held the rank of Colonel in the Syrian Army.

Malki's assassination led to a crackdown on the SSNP in Syria.

Family History and Childhood 
Adnan al-Malki was born in 1918 to a wealthy and prestigious Damascene family. Malki's family were originally North African Ulama trained in the Maliki school of jurisprudence.

Military career 
Adnan al-Malki graduated from Homs Military Academy in 1935.

In 1951, President Adib al-Shishakli outlawed most political parties in Syria. Malki, concerned with Presidents actions, urged that the Ba'ath Party and the Arab Socialist Party merge. This new consolidated party became known as the Ba'ath Arab Socialist Party in late 1952.

In 1953, Malki submitted a memorandum that Colonel Shishakli at the Damascus airport upon his return from Cairo, to release all political prisoners and end the one party rule. This led to his imprisonment in 1954. After military rule ended, Malki was reinstated in the army and promoted to Deputy Chief of Staff.

Views and Baath Party Affiliation 
Malki never became a member of the Baath party. He was close to the military leadership of the Baath and his brother Riyad was a long time Baathist. Malki was a Nasserist as well as an Arab nationalist. This collided in particular with the views of the Syrian nationalist SSNP who sought unity with Lebanon, Jordan, Iraq and Palestine instead of Egypt.

Assassination
On Friday 22 April 1955, Senior officers including Adnan al-Malki went to the Damascus Municipal Stadium to cheer on the army's football team against a visiting Egyptian team. Malki was seated in the VIP box along with General Shuqayr and the Egyptian ambassador. Halfway through the game, military police sergeant Yunis Abdul Rahim fired two shots into Malki with his revolver killing him. Abdul Rahim appeared to have personal motivation in the assassination since a few months prior, Malki had denied him entry for sectarian reasons into the Homs Military Academy. Abdul Rahim attempted to commit suicide shortly after, however, the gun jammed and he committed suicide with a back-up gun. According to other sources, Abdul Rahim did not act for his own account but killed Malki at the personal order of the SSNP's then party leader George Abd al-Massih.

Legacy 
The SSNP was outlawed in Syria. The leadership of the party was arrested or exiled. The aftermath of the assassination also entailed a split within the party. A large statue of Adnan al-Malki was placed in central Damascus and a luxurious neighborhood was named after him by the Ba'ath party that came to power in 1963.

References

Bibliography

1918 births
1955 deaths
Arab Socialist Ba'ath Party – Syria Region politicians
Assassinated military personnel
Assassinated Syrian politicians
Nasserists
Politicians from Damascus
Syrian Arab nationalists
Syrian colonels
Homs Military Academy alumni